Branislav Stanković may refer to:
 Branko Stanković, Branislav "Branko" Stanković, Yugoslavian football (soccer) player
 Branislav Stankovič, Slovak tennis player